KIVI-TV (channel 6) is a television station licensed to Nampa, Idaho, United States, serving the Boise area as an affiliate of ABC. It is owned by the E. W. Scripps Company, which provides certain services to Caldwell-licensed Fox affiliate KNIN-TV (channel 9, which was directly co-owned with KIVI from 2009 to 2015) under a shared services agreement (SSA) with Gray Television. Both stations share studios on East Chisholm Drive in Nampa (along I-84/US 30/SH-55), while KIVI-TV's transmitter is located at the Bogus Basin ski area summit in unincorporated Boise County.

KIVI-TV operates KSAW-LD in Twin Falls, a semi-satellite of KIVI for the Magic Valley. It airs KIVI's ABC programs and some of its newscasts, alongside local commercials, separate evening newscasts produced from Nampa covering the Twin Falls area, and separate syndicated programming. KSAW-LD also maintains a small advertising sales office in the Blue Lakes Office Park on Falls Avenue in Twin Falls.

History

Prior use of channel 6

Prior to KIVI-TV's establishment, there had been two failed attempts to establish a station on the Nampa channel 6 allocation.

The first of these earned the distinction of being Idaho's first television station. KFXD-TV broadcast from June 18 to August 11, 1953. However, it was unable to obtain a network affiliation, struggled to find programming and was a two-man operation, resulting in its prompt closure. It was the first VHF television station in the United States to cease broadcasting altogether.

KCIX-TV had a longer run on the air, from November 1958 to January 1960. However, it, too, failed to secure an ABC affiliation, and the station went silent awaiting the completion of a merger deal with a radio and television station in Pocatello that fell apart.

Early years
In 1968, two parties filed to make a third attempt at channel 6 in Nampa, both of them seeking a hookup with ABC. Actor Robert Taylor was the headline name in one bidder, Snake River Valley Television, while James Lavenstein of Salt Lake City backed the bid of the Idaho Television Corporation. A construction permit was granted to Idaho Television Corporation on May 26, 1971.

The station signed on February 1, 1974, as KITC, representing its ownership. It was delayed a month by the collapse of the tower for Pocatello sister station KPTO (changed before launch to KPVI) during construction. For the first time, Boise had full network service from all three stations; previously, ABC programming was split between CBS affiliate KBOI-TV (channel 2) and NBC station KTVB (channel 7). On April 15, KITC changed its call sign to KIVI. At that time, the station opened its Nampa studios, after having begun broadcasting from two mobile homes, and began producing local news programming on April 27, the same day that KPVI launched.

Idaho Television Company sold KIVI and its then-sister KPVI in Pocatello to Futura Titanium Corporation in 1977. Futura, in turn, sold the station to the Evening Post Publishing Company in 1981, and Evening Post struck a deal to sell the station to Milwaukee-based Journal Communications in 2001, with the deal closing in 2002.

While KIVI had operated a translator in the Magic Valley since 1985—despite the later existence of KKVI, a full-power ABC affiliate and satellite of KPVI established in 1989—an affiliation shuffle in January 1996, in which KPVI became an NBC affiliate but KKVI instead switched to Fox, led to the upgrading of translator K68CO to semi-satellite KSAW-LP, airing its own commercials.

Becoming a duopoly and sale to Scripps

On July 1, 2008 it was reported Banks Broadcasting had agreed to sell KNIN to Journal Communications (owner of KIVI) which would create Boise's first television duopoly. On November 10, the Federal Communications Commission (FCC) initially rejected the application. Shortly afterward, Banks Broadcasting filed an appeal. The FCC reversed its decision to reject the deal on January 16, 2009. The purchase closed on April 24, at which point KNIN vacated its longtime studios on West Bannock Street in downtown Boise and was integrated into KIVI's facilities in Nampa.

On July 30, 2014, it was announced that E. W. Scripps Company would acquire Journal Communications in an all-stock transaction. The combined firm retained the companies' broadcast holdings and spun off their print assets as Journal Media Group. Originally, KIVI-TV, KNIN-TV and five radio stations were not included in the merger; in September, Journal filed to transfer these stations to Journal/Scripps Divestiture Trust (with Kiel Media Group as trustee). The merger was completed on April 1, 2015. Scripps retained KIVI and the five radio stations, but not KNIN. However, KIVI continues to provide services and facilities to KNIN, which was sold to Raycom Media and is now owned by Gray Television. Coincidentally, in 2019, Scripps would acquire Evening Post's broadcasting arm (at that point known as Cordillera Communications), which reunited KIVI with nearly all of its former Evening Post sister stations.

Programming

Syndicated programming
Syndicated programming on KIVI includes Tamron Hall, The Rachael Ray Show, The Drew Barrymore Show, The Kelly Clarkson Show, Access Hollywood, and TMZ Live.

News operation

The station currently ranks at a distant second place to KTVB (and sometimes third behind KBOI) in Nielsen ratings for all newscast periods. Until July 2010, KIVI aired an hour-long broadcast weeknights at 6 along with KBOI. The 6:30 portion was eventually dropped as a result of low viewership in the comparative time slot. Following Journal's acquisition of KNIN, KIVI began producing a weeknight prime time newscast on that station. Known as Today's 6 News on K9, the show was seen for thirty minutes and competed with a nightly half-hour newscast on then RTV affiliate KYUU-LP (which was produced by KBOI).

In January 2011, KIVI upgraded its local newscasts to 16:9 enhanced definition widescreen with the KNIN show being included in the change. Although not true high definition level, broadcasts match the aspect ratio of HD television screens. Corresponding with KNIN's affiliation switch to Fox in September 2011, its prime time show became known as Fox 9 News at 9 and initially featured separate news anchors but shared other personnel with KIVI.

The prime time show was also expanded to an hour on weeknights and added a weekend edition. Around the same time, the station's logo coloring was changed from gold, maroon and silver to red, white and blue; this was to allow the station to utilize the same standardized Renderon graphics package used by Journal's Milwaukee flagship WTMJ-TV and other company-owned stations.

Although most semi-satellites of another station provide some coverage of their home territory (in this case, the state of Idaho), until 2020, KSAW did not produce any local inserts for the Magic Valley during KIVI's newscasts since there were no news-related personnel locally based out of their Twin Falls offices. On April 13, 2020, following the hiring of three Twin Falls-based reporters, KSAW launched separate evening newscasts, which are produced and anchored out of KIVI; morning and weekend newscasts continue to be simulcast on both stations. Concurrently, KIVI and KSAW rebranded from 6 On Your Side to Idaho News 6.

Technical information

Subchannels
The station's digital signal is multiplexed:

Analog-to-digital conversion
KIVI shut down its analog signal, over VHF channel 6, on June 19, 2009, one week later. All of Journal's television stations (including KIVI) added or regained the -TV suffix. The station's digital signal remained on its pre-transition UHF channel 24. Through the use of PSIP, digital television receivers display the station's virtual channel as its former VHF analog channel 6.

Translators

References

External links

Television channels and stations established in 1974
1974 establishments in Idaho
IVI-TV
ABC network affiliates
Laff (TV network) affiliates
Bounce TV affiliates
Ion Mystery affiliates
E. W. Scripps Company television stations